Fenner is an unincorporated community in San Bernardino County, California, United States.

Fenner was named for either Arthur Fenner or his son James, both governors of Rhode Island.

From 1942 to 1944 site of US Army training Camp Clipper.

References

Unincorporated communities in San Bernardino County, California
Unincorporated communities in California